Cyanea quercifolia, known as oakleaf cyanea, was a species of plant native to the Hawaiian island of Maui. The plant is now considered extinct, as its native habitat has been mostly destroyed, and no new individuals have been found.

References

quercifolia
Biota of Oahu
Endemic flora of Hawaii
Extinct flora of Hawaii
Plant extinctions since 1500